Grafton Ponds Natural Area Preserve is a  Natural Area Preserve located in York County, Virginia.  It preserves Virginia's best remaining example of a coastal plain pond complex, and supports several locally-rare species including pond spice (Litsea aestivalis), Mabee's salamander (Ambystoma mabeei), barking treefrog (Hyla gratiosa), and the globally imperiled Harper's fimbristylis (Fimbristylis perpusilla).

The preserve is owned and maintained by the city of Newport News, and is open for public access.

See also
 List of Virginia Natural Area Preserves

References

External links
Virginia Department of Conservation and Recreation: Grafton Ponds Natural Area Preserve

Virginia Natural Area Preserves
Protected areas of York County, Virginia